Stanley Moss (born June 21, 1925) is an American poet, publisher, and art dealer.

Life and work
Moss was born in Woodhaven, New York on June 21, 1925. His father was a high school principal. The family was non-religious, but occasionally celebrated Jewish holidays. A tour of Southern Europe and the Middle East at the age of eight, described in the essay "Satyr Song," greatly impacted Moss, exposing him to European painting, Levantine culture, and geopolitics.

Moss was hired as an editorial assistant at New Directions in 1949. His first book of poems, The Wrong Angel, was published in 1966. He is the author of five other books of poems: The Skull of Adam (1979), The Intelligence of Clouds (1989), Asleep in the Garden (1997), A History of Color  (2003), New & Selected Poems 2006 , and God Breaketh Not All Men's Hearts Alike: New & Later Collected Poems (2011) .

Bibliography

Poetry 
Collections
 The Wrong Angel, Macmillan (1966); Anvil Press (1969)
 The Skull of Adam, Horizon Press (1979); Anvil Press (1979)
 The Intelligence of Clouds, Harcourt Brace Jovanovich (1989); Anvil Press (1989)
 Asleep in the Garden, Seven Stories Press (1997); Anvil Press (1998)
 A History of Color, Seven Stories Press (2003)
 Songs of Imperfection, Anvil Press (2004)
 New & Selected Poems, Seven Stories Press (2006)
 Rejoicing: New and Collected Poems, Anvil Press (2009)
 God Breaketh Not All Men's Hearts Alike: New & Later Collected Poems, Seven Stories Press (2011)
 No Tear Is Commonplace, Carcanet (2013)
 It's About Time, Hopewell (2015); Carcanet (2015)
 Almost Complete Poems, Seven Stories Press (2016); Carcanet (2017)
 Abandoned Poems, Seven Stories Press (2018)
 Act V Scene I, Seven Stories Press (2020)

List of poems

As editor 
 Trilce by César Vallejo, translated by Rebecca Seiferle, Sheep Meadow Press (1992)
 Interviews and Encounters with Stanley Kunitz, Sheep Meadow Press (1993)
 To Stanley Kunitz, with Love: From Poet Friends: For His 96th Birthday, Sheep Meadow Press (2002)
 A Book for Daniel Stern: By Friends, co-edited with Pamela M. Diamond, Sheep Meadow Press (2006)
 Last Day of the Year: Selected Poems by Michael Krüger, translated by Karen J. Leeder and Richard Dove, Sheep Meadow Press (2014)

Notes

External links
 Stanley Moss website
 "The Good Shepherd" 

American male poets
American book publishers (people)
American art dealers
1925 births
Living people
People from Woodhaven, Queens
The New Yorker people